The men's 50m freestyle events at the 2019 World Para Swimming Championships were held in the London Aquatics Centre at the Queen Elizabeth Olympic Park in London between 9–15 September.

Medalists

Results

S3
Heats
17 swimmers from 14 nations took part.

Final

S4
Heats
14 swimmers from 13 nations took part.

Final

S5
Heats
16 swimmers from 12 nations took part.

Final

S6
Heats
19 swimmers from 16 nations took part.

Final

S7

S8
Heats
14 swimmers from 12 nations took part.

Final

S9

S10
Heats
13 swimmers from 9 nations took part.

Final

S11
Heats
21 swimmers from 12 nations took part.

Final

S12
Heats
13 swimmers from 8 nations took part.

Final

S13
Heats
13 swimmers from 9 nations took part.

Final

References

2019 World Para Swimming Championships